IGC may stand for:


Companies
 Intelligent Graphics Corporation, marketer of the VM/386 multitasking operating system or 'control program'
 Istituto Geografico Centrale, an Italian private mapping company
 Immortals Gaming Club, an esports company
 Inquirer Group of Companies, a Philippine mass media conglomerate

Politics
 Intergovernmental Conference, the formal procedure for negotiating amendments to the founding treaties of the European Union
 International Grains Council, an intergovernmental organisation concerned with grains trade
 Iraqi Governing Council, the provisional government of Iraq from July 13, 2003 to June 1, 2004

Science
 Inverse gas chromatography, an analytical technique in the analysis of the surfaces of solids
 Interchromatin granule cluster, a nanostructure inside the cell nucleus

Organizations
 Intergovernmental Commission, which regulates the Channel Tunnel
 International Gender Champions, an organizationworking for gender equality
 International Geological Congress, a convention held by the International Union of Geological Sciences
 International Grains Council, an intergovernmental organization
 International Growth Centre, a research institute associated with the London School of Economics, England
 Institute for Global Communications or IGC Internet, an institution that provides Internet presence for groups deemed "progressive"
 Instituto Gulbenkian de Ciência, a biological research-oriented institute belonging to the Gulbenkian Foundation, Oeiras, Portugal
 International Gliding Commission or FAI Gliding Commission, the international governing body for the sport of gliding which standardized .igc file format.
 International Gospel Centre, the headquarters of Word of Life Bible Church, Warri, Nigeria

Other uses
 IAPMO Guide Criteria, IAPMO Standards for the International Association of Plumbing and Mechanical Officials
 IGC Centre, a lava dome in Mount Edziza Provincial Park, British Columbia, Canada
 Independent Garden Center Show or IGC Show, Chicago, Illinois, US
 Instant Game Collection, a feature of PS Plus on Sony's PlayStation Network (PSN/SEN)
 Intergranular corrosion or intergranular attack, a form of corrosion